The Stoke to Market Drayton Line was a railway line that ran through Staffordshire and Shropshire that was built by the North Staffordshire Railway.

Construction

The first part of the line to be built required the private Silverdale & Newcastle Railway, built in 1850 by ironmaster Ralph Sneyd, to become public. This was enabled by an Act of 1859 and passenger services from Stoke to Newcastle began in 1862. Silverdale was reached in May 1863.

Meanwhile, the Great Western Railway was planning to reach Manchester and in an effort to block this, the Market Drayton extension was completed in February 1870.

Services

The early years of the 20th century were the busiest, there being thirteen trains daily from Stoke to Silverdale and five to Market Drayton.

Railmotor services began in 1905 and several new halts were built. Running from Silverdale as far as Trentham, they were intended to compete with trams and were somewhat successful in this respect, although they only lasted until 1926.

The section between Silverdale and Pipe Gate was reduced to single track in October 1934.

Dwindling passenger numbers after World War II meant that there were only two trains daily from Stoke to Market Drayton, and services ceased on 7 May 1956 when they were cut back to Silverdale. Passenger services to the latter ceased in 1964, a casualty of the Beeching Axe.

Freight traffic
Express Dairies had a creamery with private siding access to Pipe Gate, allowing its preferred transport partner the GWR to provide milk trains to the facility, for onward scheduling to London.

Following nationalisation there was a very considerable increase in freight traffic on this route reaching a peak of 10,000 tons weekly in 1962–63.

In 1962 a new "chord" line was opened at Madeley to provide a connection to the West Coast Main Line. This was used as a diversionary route when the Harecastle diversion line was being constructed and continued in use for freight workings once the latter was completed.

After closure of the creamery at Pipe Gate, the route between Market Drayton and Madeley Chord closed for good in 1966. That same year, the line between Newcastle Junction (Stoke) and Brampton Sidings was closed and the junction severed in preparation for the West Coast Main Line electrification. The Pool Dam branch survived until 7 October 1967.

Final years

The last traffic on the line was coal from Apedale and Silverdale collieries, which ceased in December 1998 when the latter was closed.

Present day

, the line remains extant but out of use between Newcastle and just west of Madeley Road station. The line is also extant from Silverdale Tunnel, and now a public footpath runs along the line, from its start in Stoke-on-Trent (Cockshot Lock/Newcastle Junction) to as far as Silverdale station.

The station site at Newcastle-Under-Lyme has been landscaped, and Market Drayton's has been demolished and built on by both a Morrisons store and an industrial complex. 

In 2009 the platforms at Silverdale were cleared of vegetation and the derelict track from the former station site to the tunnel portal was lifted but the track remains intact between Silverdale and Pipe Gate via Keele and Madeley Road.

In January 2019, Campaign for Better Transport released a report identifying the line between Stoke and Wellington which was listed as Priority 2 for reopening. Priority 2 is for those lines which require further development or a change in circumstances (such as housing developments).

Stations

References

Closed railway lines in the West Midlands (region)
Rail transport in Staffordshire
Rail transport in Shropshire
Railway lines opened in 1870
North Staffordshire Railway